The T75 pistol (Chinese: T75手槍) is produced by the 205th Arsenal, Ministry of National Defense (Republic of China) in Republic of China (commonly known as Taiwan).

The T75 is based on the Italian-made Beretta M92.

The T75 is in service with the Republic of China Military Police.

The T75K3 features polygonal rifling developed at National Defense University which improve both barrel life and weapon accuracy. In 2019 the Taiwanese Army allocated NT$368.6 million to acquire 10,404 T75K3 pistols to replace aging M1911A1s.

Variants
XT84
T75K1
T75K2
T75K3

References

9mm Parabellum semi-automatic pistols
Firearms of the Republic of China